The Sidi Bel Abbès Tramway is a system of public transport in Sidi Bel Abbès, Algeria. The first section includes  of route and 22 stops.

History

The construction of the line was commissioned to the Turkish company Yapi Merkezi and its subcontractor ENGIE.

On 22 June 2013, the Algerian Minister of Transport, Amar Tou, announced the start of work on the network.

The first of the 30 Alstom Citadis 402 type trams, assembled by the Annaba-based Cital, was delivered to Sidi Bel Abbès on 8 April 2016.

The line was inaugurated on 25 July 2017.

References

Tram transport in Algeria
Light rail in Algeria
2018 establishments in Algeria